Fabrizio Ranieri (born 22 February 1968) is an Italian lightweight rower. He won a gold medal at the 1990 World Rowing Championships in Tasmania with the lightweight men's eight.

References

1968 births
Living people
Italian male rowers
World Rowing Championships medalists for Italy